Pottsville is the county seat of Schuylkill County, Pennsylvania, United States. The population was 13,346 at the 2020 census, and is the principal city of the Pottsville, PA Micropolitan Statistical Area. It is located in Pennsylvania's Coal Region.

History

Early settlement
King Charles II granted the land that would eventually become Pottsville to William Penn. This grant comprised all lands west and south of the Delaware River and the Schuylkill; the site of Pottsville was originally in Chester County. When the legislative Council, on May 10, 1729, enacted the law erecting Lancaster County, which included all the lands of the Province lying westward of a straight line drawn northeasterly from the headwaters of Octoraro Creek (near the southern borders) marked with blazed trees, to the Schuylkill River, then this placed Pottsville in Lancaster County. By enactment of the same Council, approved on March 11, 1752, Berks County was erected; this placed Pottsville within the limits of that county.

Pottsville's anthracite coal history began in 1790 when a coal seam was discovered by hunter Necho Allen. Legend has it that Allen fell asleep at the base of the Broad Mountain and woke to the sight of a large fire; his campfire had ignited an outcropping of coal. By 1795 an anthracite-fired finery forge was established on the Schuylkill River.

19th century

In 1806, John Pott, the founder of Pottsville, purchased the forge. By an act of Assembly of the Commonwealth approved March 1, 1811, the County of Schuylkill was erected out of portions of Berks and Northampton; this placed the site of Pottsville in Schuylkill County. The town was formally laid out in 1816 by a local surveyor, Henry Donnell. Pottsville was established as a village in Norwegian Township in 1819 and incorporated as a borough on February 19, 1828.

In 1829, D.G. Yuengling & Son established the oldest brewery in the United States. In 1851 Pottsville became the county seat, the original county seat being Orwigsburg.

The Philadelphia and Reading Coal and Iron Company, which has its roots in the Philadelphia and Reading Railway Company, the remnants of which were acquired in the late 20th century by the Reading Anthracite Company, acquired extensive coal lands and would become one of the most notable of the coal companies operating in Pennsylvania until the demise of the anthracite industry after World War II.

Because of its location along the Schuylkill River, Pottsville developed a small textile industry. Out of this industry grew the Phillips Van Heusen company which was founded in 1881. Moses Phillips and his wife Endel began sewing shirts by hand and selling them from pushcarts to the local coal miners. Van Heusen and other textile companies left the region starting in the late 1970s, mainly as a result of foreign competition. Another element of the textile industry was the Tilt Silk Mill on Twelfth Street, which produced silk from silk worms imported from China which fed on mulberry trees in the building's solarium. The silk business eventually was eclipsed by the development of nylon stockings. The building still stands and is presently the headquarters of a storage and vehicle rental business.

20th century
During the Prohibition period in the United States, under the 18th Amendment, Yuengling all but stopped making beer and moved to production of "near beer". The three brews produced in this time were the Yuengling Special (the most popular brand), Yuengling Por-Tor (a version of their "celebrated Pottsville Porter"), and finally, the Yuengling Juvo, which was a cereal beverage. They were allowed a limited production of porter on the grounds that it had medicinal qualities. Then-owner Frank Yuengling also opened the Yuengling Dairy, which produced ice cream and other dairy products for the local area. These ventures helped to keep the company afloat during that period.

When the 18th Amendment was repealed, Yuengling stopped production of "near beer" and resumed making alcoholic beverages. The brewery famously sent a truckload of its Winner Beer to the White House in 1933 as thanks to President Franklin D. Roosevelt for the repeal of Prohibition. Yuengling still continues its family-owned business today and is the second largest American-owned brewery. The Yuengling Dairy was operated by a different branch of the family from the Brewery. Business declined and the dairy folded as of 1985. Attempted buyouts by large conglomerate breweries have all been unsuccessful.

Pottsville was chartered as a third-class city on March 22, 1911.

Pottsville was host to a National Football League franchise from 1925 to 1928. The Pottsville Maroons played in Sportsman's Park (or Minersville Park) in nearby Minersville, now the site of King's Village shopping plaza. The Maroons posted some of the best records in the NFL during the 1925 and 1926 seasons. The Maroons had a claim to the 1925 NFL championship, but because of a controversial decision by NFL President Joe Carr, the title was instead awarded to the Chicago Cardinals. The Maroons suffered two more losing seasons before relocating to Boston and becoming the Boston Bulldogs. The Bulldogs folded in 1929.

Until the middle of the 20th century, Pottsville was a popular destination for many traveling acts and vaudeville performers. The 1929 film Berth Marks stars the comedy legends Laurel and Hardy as they attempt to reach Pottsville by train for one of their booked performances. Pearl Bailey had once resided in Pottsville during the early part of her entertaining career. Soldiers in training at nearby Fort Indiantown Gap were prohibited from visiting Pottsville during most of World War II due to the large numbers of illicit venues and activities present during the time.

21st century

The city completed a streetscaping project in 2007 on Centre Street. In June 2011, the City of Pottsville became the county's transportation hub for STS (Schuylkill Transportation System) bus service throughout the county with the $16.1 million Union Station Intermodal Transit Center at 300 South Centre Street. It also accommodates Trailways and Greyhound bus services.

The Pottsville Downtown Historic District, Cloud Home, John O'Hara House, Burd Patterson House, Pottsville Armory, D.G. Yuengling and Son Brewing Complex, and Frank D. Yuengling Mansion are listed on the National Register of Historic Places.

Geography

Topography 
Pottsville is located at  (40.685058, −76.202747).

Although there are no lakes within the city there are several water courses which flow through the city. The Schuylkill River flows through the extreme southern part of the city near Mount Carbon. The West Branch of the Schuylkill River makes up most of the western border of the city. Within the city itself, the West Branch of Norwegian Creek flows through the Fishbach section of the city and the East Branch of Norwegian Creek flows through the Jalappa section of the city. Joining together near Progress Avenue and Terry Reiley Way they form Norwegian Creek, which flows underground through the heart of the city. The creek empties into the Schuylkill River at Mauch Chunk Street.

Like ancient Rome, Pottsville sits on seven hills: Lawton's Hill, Greenwood Hill, Bunker Hill (Sharp Mountain), Guinea Hill, Forest Hills, Cottage Hill, and Mount Hope.

The Pottsville Formation is named after the town; it is a geologic complex including coal, sandstone, and coarse conglomerate that runs along the Appalachian Mountains from Alabama to New York.  Its type section is on a cut for the Pennsylvania Railroad through Sharp Mountain south of the city.

Climate 
Pottsville experiences a humid subtropical climate (Cfa) according to the Köppen climate classification system if the  isotherm is used, or a humid continental climate (Dfa) if the  isotherm is used. Average monthly temperatures range from 27.3 °F in January to 72.3 °F in July. The hardiness zone is 6b bordering on 6a and the average annual absolute minimum temperature downtown is -4.6 °F.

Demographics

As of the census of 2000, there were 15,549 people, 6,399 households, and 3,877 families residing in the city. The population density was 3,697.4 people per square mile (1,426.0/km2). There were 7,343 housing units at an average density of 1,746.1 per square mile (673.4/km2). The racial makeup of the city was 95.73% White, 2.26% African American, 0.12% Native American, 0.51% Asian, 0.01% Pacific Islander, 0.53% from other races, and 0.84% from two or more races. Hispanic or Latino of any race were 1.22% of the population.

There were 6,399 households, out of which 27.3% had children under the age of 18 living with them, 41.7% were married couples living together, 13.9% had a female householder with no husband present, and 39.4% were non-families. 34.9% of all households were made up of individuals, and 17.2% had someone living alone who was 65 years of age or older. The average household size was 2.29 and the average family size was 2.97.

In the city, the population was spread out, with 22.6% under the age of 18, 7.2% from 18 to 24, 27.2% from 25 to 44, 22.1% from 45 to 64, and 20.9% who were 65 years of age or older. The median age was 40 years. For every 100 females, there were 87.3 males. For every 100 females age 18 and over, there were 83.5 males.

The median income for a household in the city was $30,137, and the median income for a family was $41,124. Males had a median income of $31,510 versus $21,433 for females. The per capita income for the city was $18,165. About 10.1% of families and 13.9% of the population were below the poverty line, including 15.4% of those under age 18 and 10.1% of those age 65 or over.

Cityscape 
The designation of North, South, East, and West is found at the intersection of Norwegian and Centre Streets. This means that Norwegian Street divides North and South and Centre Street divides east and west. Pottsville's numbered routes are 209, 61, and 901. Interestingly the stretch of 209 on Centre Street is signed in the opposite direction of the compass.

Neighborhoods
 Center City (Downtown) – Area consisting of Centre Street and Market Street from Garfield Square to Line Street and from Nichols Street to Mauch Chunk Street.
 Yorkville – located on the west side of the city, west of the Pottsville Area High School and west of 16th Street to the city line.  Yorkville was a borough that merged with Pottsville in the early part of the twentieth century.
 Quinntown – Along W. Market Street, south and west of Garfield Square up to 16th Street.
 Lawton's Hill – East of Route 61, north of E. Norwegian Street.
 Greenwood Hill – East of Route 61, south of E. Norwegian Street.
 The Island – The area surrounding the former site of the Atkins Brothers furnace; near Washington Street and Route 61.
 Jalappa – North of Route 61 and east of Centre Street on the north side of town.
 Fishbach – West of Jalappa, in the area between Centre Street and Peacock Street.
 Russelville – Along W. Market Street, north and west of Garfield Square up to 16th Street.
 Forest Hills – a residential development south of Mount Carbon.
 Forest Hills West – a residential neighborhood south of Mount Carbon and west of Forest Hills.
 Bunker Hill – south of Mahantongo Street from S. 2nd Street to S. 11th Street.
 Morrisville – South Centre Street from Mauch Chunk Street to the city line with Mount Carbon borough.
 Guinea Hill – A residential neighborhood which extends north of W. Arch Street to W. Laurel Blvd. and from N. 3rd Street westward to N. 12th Street.
 Cottage Hill – North of West End Avenue from N. 20th Street to Westwood Road.  Subdivided into Cottage Hill West and Cottage Hill East.
 Hillside – Cressona Road from Hotel Street to the city line.
 York Farm – North of First Avenue to Mount Hope Avenue and from N. 16th Street west to the city line. (Also includes High Park Manor)
 Mount Hope – North of Laurel Boulevard to Fairmont Avenue and from N. Second Street to North 16th Street and Walter Griffith Avenue.
 Yorktowne – East of Westwood Road along Woodglen and Yorktowne Roads.

Parks and recreation areas
 Rotary Park – Located at South 20th & Mahantongo Streets, is one of the largest recreational areas in the city. It includes Pottsville Rotary Little League which can accommodate night games. Also, the park includes a basketball court.  There is also playground equipment located on the Norwegian Street side of the park. The park has a fairly large grassy area. The park lacks shade trees.
 Railway Park – Located in the Yorkville section of Pottsville at the end of First Avenue the park includes the home of Railway Park Little League, the 1997 United States Eastern Region Champions of Little League Baseball.
 General George Joulwan East Side Park – Located on East Norwegian Street, the park is built in tiers along the hillside. In the past, the park included the East Side swimming pool; but this has been demolished and now is home to a skate park. Basketball courts and playground equipment are also located in the park.
 Henry Clay Park – Located on South Second Street, high on the hilltop overlooking the south side of Pottsville is the Henry Clay Monument. The park is relatively small with no benches or recreational equipment or fields. A larger park was originally planned to be built around it shortly after its construction, but it never materialized. However, the current park is small and quaint and many trees surround which provide a cool spot and a breath-taking view of South Centre Street and the Pottsville Hospital & Warne Clinic.
 John F. Kennedy Memorial Recreation Complex – It is the city's main park. It has an entrance on York Farm Road, it also has a Parking Lot which can handle moderate numbers of vehicles, two basketball courts, four tennis courts, and one volleyball court and is home to the JFK Memorial Pool, a community, non-membership pool, it also has a jogging/walking path which connects it to nearby Railway Park. The path has benches in shady, wooded areas. The walking/jogging path is built on an old railroad bed. It terminates at Westwood Road. The park also has a fairly large grassy area between the Sports Courts and the pool. Pets are permitted but must be on a leash. The same rules apply in other city park parcels. The complex is located near the Pottsville Area School District city school parcels.
 Yuengling Park – Located at South Tenth and Mahantongo Streets, Yuengling Park is the location of the old spring house which was used for the Brewery back in the 19th century.  The park is filled with natural fountains, grass, flowers and benches and a large pavilion.  The park has no playground facilities but provides a peaceful spot near the hub of the city.
 Bunker Hill Playground – Located between Schuylkill Avenue and Pierce St., the playground has updated their equipment but is a relaxing area to spend the day with the family.
 Barefield Outdoor Recreation Complex – This  recreation complex is located at the corner of North Centre Street and Terry Reiley Way in Pottsville. It features a full-size basketball court, horseshoe pits, putting green, and a sand volleyball court. Use of this facility is free to the public.
 Others – There are many other playgrounds located through the city, including, 17th Street Playground, 12th Street Playground, 11th & Arch Street Playground, Race Street Playground, Peacock Street Playground, Jalappa Playground, Fairview Street Playground, Main Street Playground, Greenwood Hill Playground, and Forest Hills Playground.

Points of interest

Pottsville has several points of interest, including:
 Schuylkill County Courthouse – N. Second Street & W. Laurel Blvd. (tours available)
 Henry Clay Monument – South 2nd Street
 Garfield Square Monuments – N. Fifth & W. Market Streets
 D.G. Yuengling & Son Brewery – (Tours Available) – S. 5th and Mahantongo Streets
 Jerry's Classic Cars Museum – S. Centre Street near Mauch Chunk Street (Not exactly at the corner).
 Schuylkill County Historical Society – N. Centre Street & W. Race Street
 Jewish Museum of Eastern Pennsylvania – 2501 West End Avenue
 Garfield Diner – N. Fourth & W. Market Streets at Garfield Square
 General George Joulwan Monument – Joulwan Memorial Park (East Side Park) East Norwegian & Anderson Streets.
 Veterans' Memorial Stadium (Home of Pottsville Crimson Tide Football) – N. 16th & Elk Avenue (Behind Pottsville Area High School).
 John O'Hara Monument – S. Centre Street and W. Howard Avenue
 John O'Hara House – 606 Mahantongo Street
 Veterans' Memorial – General George Joulwan Park, E. Norwegian & Anderson Sts.
 Pottsville Skatepark – E. Norwegian & Anderson Sts. (Joulwan Park)
 JFK Memorial Pool – York Farm Road @ High Park Manor.
 Sovereign Majestic Theater (Performing Arts) – N. Centre Street (half a block south of the Historical Society.)
 World War I Monument – W. Arch & N. 11th Sts.
 Pilger Ruh Brewing - 213 N. Centre St
 Pressed Coffee and Books - 123 Mahantongo Street (also birthplace of John O'Hara)
 Black Rock Brewing Company - 325 S. Centre Street

Sports
Pottsville fielded a team in the National Football League between 1925 and 1929 called the Pottsville Maroons.

Pottsville also has two leagues associated with Little League Baseball:  Pottsville (Rotary) Little League, and Railway Park Little League.  Railway Park was the U.S. Eastern Regional representative in the 1997 Little League World Series.

The Pottsville Crimson Tide football team is one of the oldest prep football programs in the country.  At the end of the 2007 football season, Pottsville had played 1137 games, which tied them for first in the nation among prep games played.

Pottsville once played a game in New York against the New York Giants.

Media
The Republican & Herald is the only local daily newspaper serving Pottsville. There are also two radio stations broadcasting from Pottsville.
 WAVT-FM 101.9-FM (Hot AC)
 WPPA 1360-AM 105.9-FM (Talk & Sports)

The area is also served by local television stations from the Scranton/Wilkes-Barre area.  They include WNEP-TV 16 (ABC), WYOU-TV 22 (CBS), WBRE-TV 28 (NBC), WVIA-TV 44 (PBS) and WOLF-TV 56 (FOX).

Communications
Dial telephone service came to Pottsville on August 30, 1956, with Mayor George Heffner making the first call on the new MArket 2 exchange, which still exists. Since then five exchanges have been added to serve the city.

Transportation

Pottsville is served by a small general aviation airport, Schuylkill County Airport (ZER).
Since 2011 Intercity public bus service has been provided at the Union Station Intermodal Transit Center at 300 South Centre Street. Mass transit for the greater Pottsville area is provided by Schuylkill Transportation System, which operates inter-city bus services throughout the county. The Union Station Intermodal Transit Center also accommodates Greyhound and Trailways. Two major highways converge on Pottsville, Pennsylvania Route 61 and U.S. Route 209.

Passenger train service between Pottsville, Reading and Philadelphia was operated by Conrail under the auspices of SEPTA until July 29, 1981. The station site has since been demolished and replaced with a parking lot.

Healthcare
The Lehigh Valley Hospital–Schuylkill is an affiliation between two community hospitals formerly known as Good Samaritan Regional Medical Center and The Pottsville Hospital and Warne Clinic, both of which are located in Pottsville. On August 1, 2008, Schuylkill Health became the new parent organization for both facilities and their related health systems. The medical center is designated a Level III Trauma center by the Pennsylvania Trauma Systems Foundation. On September 16, 2016, Schuylkill Health became part of Lehigh Valley Health Network.

Notable people

 Meredith Averill, television writer and producer
 Gary Becker, 1992 Nobel Prize–winning economist
 Stan Bergstein, harness racing executive, member Harness Racing Hall of Fame
 Rudine Sims Bishop, educator considered the "mother of multicultural literature"
 Travis Blankenhorn, Major League Baseball Player
 Megan Brennan, United States Postmaster General
 Ralph E. Brock, first Black forester in the United States
 Antonio Buehler, civil rights leader
 Ronald Caravan, clarinetist
 George Cowie, Wisconsin politician
 Crobot, band
 Pat Flannery, men's basketball coach at Bucknell University
 Jan Fortune, Florida state legislator
 Anna M. Hammer (1840–1910), philanthropist and temperance movement leader
 John E. Jones III, federal judge
 George Joulwan,  Supreme Allied Commander, Europe from 1993 to 1997
 Guy Kratzer, Pennsylvania State Senator
 Peggy Maley, actress
 Jen Manion, professor and author
 Muffet McGraw, women's basketball coach at Notre Dame
 Chris Nabholz, baseball player
 James Nagle, Civil War general
 Arthur C. Neville, Mayor of Green Bay, Wisconsin
 J. C. Neville, Wisconsin politician
 John O'Hara, author of Appointment in Samarra (which is set in a fictionalized version of Pottsville_, BUtterield 8, and Pal Joey
 Ralph Peters, author, Retired Military. Fox News Military Contributor
 Henry Pleasants, engineer and Civil War general
 Lance Rautzhan, Major League Baseball pitcher
 Howie Smith, musician and educator
 Matt Wachter, musician
 Bill Walsh, author and editor
 Jude Wanniski, editor and economic advisor to Ronald Reagan

Public and private education
 Pottsville Area School District, including Pottsville Area High School, D.H.H. Lengel Middle School, and John S. Clarke Elementary Center
 Assumption BVM – part of the Roman Catholic Diocese of Allentown 
 Gillingham Charter School – public charter school
 Literacy Council for Schuylkill County
 Joseph F McCloskey School of Nursing at Schuylkill Health
 Nativity BVM High School – part of the Roman Catholic Diocese of Allentown 
 Perception Training Center
 Pottsville Free Public Library
 Saint Joseph's School of Learning for Special Needs

Colleges and universities
 Penn State Schuylkill, located in nearby Schuylkill Haven, Pennsylvania
 Alvernia University Schuylkill Satellite Campus

Religious facilities

Cultural References
John O'Hara's 1934 novel Appointment in Samarra is set in a fictionalized version of Pottsville (called "Gibbsville").

See also
 Pottsville Formation, a geological stratum named for the town

References

External links

 Pottsville Area Development Corporation
 Visitor information for Pottsville, Pennsylvania
 

 
Cities in Pennsylvania
Cities in Schuylkill County, Pennsylvania
County seats in Pennsylvania
Mining communities in Pennsylvania
Municipalities of the Anthracite Coal Region of Pennsylvania
Populated places established in 1806